Geovany Oscar Baca (born March 5, 1971) is a retired male boxer from Honduras, who competed in the men's light flyweight (– 48 kg) division during the 1990s.

He is best known for winning the bronze medal as an amateur in his weight category at the 1995 Pan American Games in Mar del Plata, Argentina. Baca also represented his native country at the 1996 Summer Olympics in Atlanta, Georgia, where he was eliminated in the 
first round by Madagascar's Anicet Rasonnaivo (0-12).

References
 

1971 births
Living people
Flyweight boxers
Boxers at the 1995 Pan American Games
Boxers at the 1996 Summer Olympics
Olympic boxers of Honduras
Pan American Games bronze medalists for Honduras
Honduran male boxers
Pan American Games medalists in boxing
Medalists at the 1995 Pan American Games